Charles Kittredge True (August 14, 1809June 20, 1878) was a United States Methodist Episcopal clergyman, educator, and author.

Biography
He was born in Portland, Maine.  He graduated at Harvard in 1832, and was subsequently pastor of several Methodist churches. He entered the New England Conference, 1833; was agent of the New England Education Society, 1834; principal of Amenia Seminary, 1835; entered the New York Conference, 1836; was transferred to the New England Conference, 1838. In 1849 he received the degree of D.D. from Harvard. He served as professor of intellectual and moral science in Wesleyan University (1849–61), and financial agent of Wesleyan (1870–73). He died in Brooklyn, New York.

Works
 The Elements of Logic (1840)  
 Shawmut; or, the Settlement of Boston by the Puritan Pilgrims (1845)  
 John Winthrop and the Great Colony (1875)  
 The Life and Times of Sir Walter Raleigh (1877)  
 The Life and Times of John Knox (1878)  
 Memoirs of John Howard (1878)  
 The Thirty Years' War (1878)  
 Heroes of Holland (1882)  
 Life of Captain John Smith (1882)
He edited the Oregonian and Indian Advocate in 1839 in Boston, Massachusetts.

Family
He married Elizabeth Bassett Hyde. They were the parents of agricultural educationist Alfred Charles True and zoologist Frederick William True.

Notes

References
 
 
 

19th-century American historians
19th-century American male writers
American biographers
American Methodist clergy
Harvard University alumni
Wesleyan University faculty
Writers from Portland, Maine
1809 births
1878 deaths
19th-century Methodists
19th-century American clergy
American male non-fiction writers